Frederick Ford may refer to:

Frederick John Ford, Anglican priest
Frederick W. Ford (1909–1986), Chairman of the Federal Communications Commission (1960–1961)

See also
Fred Ford (disambiguation)